The 1934–35 Toronto Maple Leafs season was Toronto's 18th season of play in the National Hockey League (NHL). The Maple Leafs placed first in the Canadian Division, and won two playoff series to advance to the Stanley Cup final, only to lose to the Montreal Maroons.

Offseason

Regular season

Final standings

Record vs. opponents

Schedule and results

Playoffs
The Maple Leafs played the Boston Bruins in the second round in a best of five series and won 3–1.  In the finals against the Montreal Maroons, they lost a best of five series 3–1.

Player statistics

Regular season
Scoring

Goaltending

Playoffs
Scoring

Goaltending

Awards and records

Transactions
May 12, 1934: Traded Charlie Sands to the Boston Bruins for cash
May 12, 1934: Loaned Jack Shill to the Boston Bruins for the 1934–35 season
October 30, 1934: Signed Free Agent Phil Stein
January 8, 1935: Lost Free Agent Earl Miller to the Buffalo Bisons of the IHL
February 13, 1935: Acquired Frank Finnigan from the St. Louis Eagles for cash

See also
1934–35 NHL season

References

Toronto Maple Leafs seasons
Toronto
Toronto